Christopher Barina Kaiser is a noted author and scholar, with doctorates in astrophysics (Harvard/University of Colorado) and Christian dogmatics (University of Edinburgh). His Creation and the History of Science (1991) received an outstanding book award from the Templeton Foundation. Henry Margenau and William G. Pollard, by his own admission, were two writers who influenced him as a science student in the 1960s.

Published works

Citation: Science and Religion in the English Speaking World, 1600-1727 A Bibliographic Guide to the Secondary Literature, Richard S. Brooks & David K. Himrod, Scarecrow Press, 2001, page 241:
This is a wide-ranging survey of the interaction of the doctrine of creation and physical science from the patristic writers of the early church to Einstein and Bohr. It is a useful volume in a series of introductory textbooks in the history of theology. His approach is similar to that of the history-of-ideas school. Kaiser argues that the basic theme in the "creation tradition" is "that the entire universe is subject to a single code of law which was established along with the universe at the beginning of time." This theme manifested itself in four flexible ideas: (1) the comprehensibility of the world; (2) the unity of earth and heaven; (3) the relative autonomy of nature; and (4) the ministry of health care and reconciliation. A majority of the book deals with theologians and natural philosophers from the sixteenth through the eighteenth centuries. Kaiser discusses many of the topics important for this bibliography--from hermeticism to the Puritan thesis. For example, he has an interesting insight into the relation between Newton's Arianism and his views of space and time. Kaiser is good on the details of theological differences and theological rationale. In this, his work complements those historians of science who miss the nuances within theological debates.  The usefulness of Kaiser's book is partially frustrated by a lack of footnotes, some correctable mistakes, and some overapplications of his thesis to particular figures. Overall, however, it is recommended as a replacement for Dillenberger's comparable survey.

 In Book: Religion & Science: History, Method, Dialogue

Astrophysics
His astrophysics doctoral thesis was titled The thermal emission of interplanetary dust cloud models, published by the University of Colorado in 1968.

External links
His faculty page on the Western Theological Seminary website
His thank you note to William G. Pollard for Pollard's Man on a Spaceship

References

Harvard University alumni
University of Colorado alumni
Living people
1941 births